Trichophorum is a genus of flowering plants in the sedge family, Cyperaceae. Plants in this genus are known as deergrasses in Britain but are sometimes known as bulrushes in North America. It contains the following species:
 Trichophorum alpinum (L.) Pers.
 Trichophorum cespitosum (L.) Hartm.
 Trichophorum clementis (M.E. Jones) S.G. Sm.
 Trichophorum clintonii (A. Gray) S.G. Sm.
 Trichophorum dolichocarpum Zakirov
 Trichophorum germanicum Palla
 Trichophorum planifolium (Spreng.) Palla
 Trichophorum pumilum (Vahl) Schinz & Thell.
 Trichophorum rigidum (Steud.) Goetgh., Muasya & D.A.Simpson
 Trichophorum schansiense Hand.-Mazz.
 Trichophorum subcapitatum (Thwaites & Hook.) D.A. Simpson
 Trichophorum uniflorum (Trautv.) Malyschev & Lukitsch.

References

 
Cyperaceae genera